Silver Hill Historic District may refer to:

Silver Hill Historic District (Weston, Massachusetts), listed on the National Register of Historic Places (NRHP)
Silver Hill Historic District (Albuquerque, New Mexico), NRHP-listed